The 43rd Annual Grammy Awards were held on February 21, 2001, at the Staples Center in Los Angeles, California. Several artists earned three awards on the night. Steely Dan's haul included Album of the Year for Two Against Nature. U2 took home the Record of the Year and Song of the Year for "Beautiful Day". Dr. Dre won Producer of the Year, Non-Classical and Best Rap Album for Eminem's The Marshall Mathers LP. Eminem himself also received three awards, out of four nominations. Faith Hill took home Best Country Album for the album Breathe, Best Female Country Vocal Performance for the song's title track and Best Country Collaboration with Vocals with Tim McGraw for "Let's Make Love". Madonna opened the show with "Music".

Performers

Presenters
 Heather Locklear & Kid Rock - Best Female Pop Vocal Performance
 Ray Romano & Kevin James - Best Pop Vocal Album
 Joe, Jimmy Smits & Toni Braxton - Best Rap Album
 Mýa & Sisqo - Best R&B Performance by a Duo or Group with Vocals
 Vince Gill, Lee Ann Womack & Gloria Estefan - Best Latin Pop Album
 Melissa Etheridge, Jenna Elfman & Carson Daly - Best Rock Performance by a Duo or Group with Vocals
 Dolly Parton & Brad Paisley - Best Country Album
 Shakira & Richie Sambora - Best New Artist
 Erykah Badu & Tony Bennett - Best Jazz Vocal Album
 Val Kilmer & Robbie Robertson - Best Native American Music Album 
 Shelby Lynne & Sheryl Crow - Song of the Year
 Carlos Santana & Joni Mitchell - Record of the Year
 Stevie Wonder & Bette Midler - Album of the Year

Winners and Nominees

General
Record of the Year
 "Beautiful Day" – U2
 Brian Eno and Daniel Lanois, producers; Steve Lillywhite and Richard Rainey, engineers/mixers
 "Say My Name" – Destiny's Child 
 Rodney Jerkins, producer; LaShawn Daniels, Brad Gildem and Jean Marie Hurout, engineers/mixers
 "I Try" – Macy Gray
 Andrew Slater, producer; Dave Way, engineer/mixer
 "Music" – Madonna
 Mirwais Ahmadzai and Madonna, producers
 "Bye Bye Bye" – *NSync
 Jake Schulze and Kristian Lundin, producers; Mike Tucker, engineer/mixer

Album of the Year
 Two Against Nature – Steely Dan Walter Becker and Donald Fagen, producers; Phil Burnett, Roger Nichols, Dave Russell and Elliot Scheiner, engineers/mixers Midnite Vultures – Beck
 Beck Hansen and Dust Brothers, producers
 The Marshall Mathers LP – Eminem
 Jeff Bass, Mark Bass, Dr. Dre, Tommy Coster, Eminem and the 45 King, producers; Rich Behrens, Mike Butler, Chris Conway, Rob Ebeling, Michelle Forbes, Richard Segal Huredia, Steve King, Aaron Lepley, James McCrone, Akane Nakamura and Lance Pierre, engineers/mixers
 Kid A – Radiohead
 Radiohead, producer; Nigel Godrich, engineer/mixer
 You're the One – Paul Simon
 Paul Simon, producer; Andy Smith, engineer/mixer

Song of the Year
 "Beautiful Day" U2, songwriters (U2) "Breathe"
 Stephanie Bentley and Holly Lamar, songwriters (Faith Hill)
 "I Hope You Dance"
 Mark D. Sanders and Tia Sellers, songwriters (Lee Ann Womack)
 "I Try"
 Macy Gray, Jinsoo Lim, Jeremy Ruzumna and David Wilder, songwriters (Macy Gray)
 "Say My Name"
 LaShawn Daniels, Fred Jerkins III, Rodney Jerkins, Beyoncé Knowles, LeToya Luckett, LaTavia Roberson and Kelendria Rowland, songwriters (Destiny's Child)

Best New Artist
 Shelby Lynne Brad Paisley
 Papa Roach
 Jill Scott
 Sisqó

Alternative
Best Alternative Music Album
 Kid A – Radiohead When the Pawn – Fiona Apple
 Midnite Vultures – Beck
 Bloodflowers – The Cure
 Liverpool Sound Collage – Paul McCartney

Blues
Best Traditional Blues Album
 Simon Climie (producer), Alan Douglas (engineer), Eric Clapton (producer and artist) and B. B. King for Riding with the King
Best Contemporary Blues Album
 Tony Braunagel (producer), Joe McGrath, Terry Becker (engineers/mixers), Taj Mahal and the Phantom Blues Band for Shoutin' In Key

Children's
 Best Musical Album for Children
 Joseph Miculin (engineer/mixer and producer), Dan Rudin and Brent Truitt (engineers/mixers) and Riders in the Sky (Featuring Devon Dawson as Jessie the Yodeling Cowgirl) for Woody's Roundup: A Rootin' Tootin' Collection of Woody's Favorite Songs

 Best Spoken Word Album for Children
 David Rapkin (producer) and Jim Dale for Harry Potter and the Goblet of Fire

Comedy
 From 1994 through 2003, see "Best Spoken Comedy Album" under the "Spoken" field, below.

Classical
 Best Orchestral Performance
 Stephen Johns (producer), Mike Clements (engineer), Sir Simon Rattle (conductor) and the Berliner Philharmonic for Mahler: Sym. No. 10
 Best Classical Vocal Performance
 Christopher Raeburn (producer), Jonathan Stokes (engineer), Cecilia Bartoli and Il Giardino Armonico for The Vivaldi Album (Dell'aura al sussurrar; Alma oppressa, Etc.)
 Best Opera Recording
 Martin Sauer (producer), Jean Chatauret (engineer), Kent Nagano (conductor), Kim Begley, Dietrich Fischer-Dieskau, Dietrich Henschel, Markus Hollop, Eva Jenis, Torsten Kerl and the Orchestre de l'Opera Nationale de Lyon for Busoni: Doktor Faust
 Best Choral Performance
 Karen Wilson (producer), Don Harder (engineer), Helmuth Rilling (conductor) and the Oregon Bach Festival  Orchestra and Chorus for Penderecki: Credo
 Best Instrumental Soloist(s) Performance (with orchestra)
 Grace Row (producer), Charles Harbutt (engineer), Roger Norrington (conductor), Joshua Bell and the London Philharmonic for Maw: Violin Concerto
 Best Instrumental Soloist Performance (without orchestra)
 Tobias Lehmann (producer), Jens Schünemann (engineer) and Sharon Isbin for Dreams of a World (Works of Lauro, Ruiz-Pipo, Duarte, Etc.)
 Best Small Ensemble Performance (with or without conductor)
 Christian Gausch (producer), Wolf-Dieter Karwatky (engineer) and the Orpheus Chamber Orchestra for Shadow Dances (Stravinsky Miniatures - Tango; Suite No. 1; Octet, etc.)
 Best Chamber Music Performance
 Da-Hong Seetoo, Max Wilcox (producers and engineers) and the Emerson String Quartet for Shostakovich: The String Quartets
 Best Classical Contemporary Composition
 George Crumb (composer) and Thomas Conlin for Crumb: Star-Child
 Best Classical Album
 Da-Hong Seetoo and Max Wilcox (producers and engineers) and the Emerson String Quartet for Shostakovich: The String Quartets
 Best Classical Crossover Album
 Steven Epstein (producer), Richard King (engineer), Yo-Yo Ma, Edgar Meyer and Mark O'Connor for Appalachian Journey

Composing and arranging
 Best Instrumental Composition
 John Williams (composer) for "Theme From Angela's Ashes"
 Best Song Written for a Motion Picture, Television or Other Visual Media
 Randy Newman (songwriter) for "When She Loved Me" (From Toy Story 2) performed by Sarah McLachlan
 Best Score Soundtrack Album for a Motion Picture, Television or Other Visual Media
 Bill Bernstein, Thomas Newman (producers), Dennis Sands, Thomas Newman (engineers) and Thomas Newman (composer) for American Beauty
 Best Instrumental Arrangement
 Chick Corea (arranger) for "Spain for Sextet and Orchestra"
 Best Instrumental Arrangement Accompanying Vocalist(s)
 Vince Mendoza (arranger) for "Both Sides Now" performed by Joni Mitchell

Country
 Best Female Country Vocal Performance
 Faith Hill for "Breathe"
 Best Male Country Vocal Performance
 Johnny Cash for "Solitary Man"
 Best Country Performance by a Duo or Group with Vocal
 Asleep at the Wheel for "Cherokee Maiden"
 Best Country Collaboration with Vocals
 Faith Hill and Tim McGraw for "Let's Make Love"
 Best Country Instrumental Performance
 Alison Brown and Béla Fleck for "Leaving Cottondale"
 Best Country Song
 Mark D. Sanders and Tia Sillers (songwriters) for "I Hope You Dance" performed by Lee Ann Womack
 Best Country Album
 Byron Gallimore (producer), Julian King, Mike Shipley (engineers/mixers) and Faith Hill (producer and artist) for Breathe
 Best Bluegrass Album
 Steve Buckingham (producer), Gary Paczosa (engineer/mixer) and Dolly Parton for The Grass Is Blue

Film/TV/media
 Best Compilation Soundtrack Album for a Motion Picture, Television or Other Visual Media
 Danny Bramson and Cameron Crowe (producers) for Almost Famous performed by various artists

Folk
 Best Traditional Folk Album
 Mark Linett (engineer) and Dave Alvin (producer and artist) for Public Domain - Songs from the Wild Land
 Best Contemporary Folk Album
 Malcolm Burn (engineer and producer), Jim Watts (engineer) and Emmylou Harris for Red Dirt Girl
 Best Native American Music Album
 Tom Bee (producer) and Douglas Spotted Eagle (producer and engineer/mixer) for Gathering of Nations Pow Wow performed by various artists

Gospel
 Best Pop/Contemporary Gospel Album
 Dennis Herring (producer and engineer/mixer), Rich Hasal (engineer/mixer) and Jars of Clay for If I Left the Zoo
 Best Rock Gospel Album
 Dino Elefante, John Elefante (producers), David Hall, J.R. McNeely (engineers/mixers) and Petra for Double Take
 Best Traditional Soul Gospel Album
 Bubba Smith, Michael E. Mathis (producers) and Shirley Caesar (producer and artist) for You Can Make It
 Best Contemporary Soul Gospel Album
 Warryn "Baby Dubb" Campbell (producer) and Mary Mary for Thankful
 Best Southern, Country or Bluegrass Gospel Album
 Brent King, Alan Shulman (engineers), Ricky Skaggs (producer and artist) and Kentucky Thunder for Soldier of the Cross
 Best Gospel Choir or Chorus Album
 Carol Cymbala and Oliver Wells (producers) for Live - God Is Working performed by The Brooklyn Tabernacle Choir

Historical
 Best Historical Album
 Steve Berkowitz, Seth Rothstein (producers), Phil Schaap (producer and engineer), Michael Brooks, Seth Foster, Andreas Meyer, Woody Pornpitaksuk, Ken Robertson, Tom Ruff and Mark Wilder (engineers) for Louis Armstrong: The Complete Hot Five and Hot Seven Recordings

Jazz
 Best Jazz Instrumental Solo
 Pat Metheny for "(Go) Get It"

 Best Jazz Instrumental Album, Individual or Group
 Rob 'Wacko' Hunter (engineer/mixer and producer), Branford Marsalis (producer) and the Branford Marsalis Quartet for Contemporary Jazz

 Best Large Jazz Ensemble Album
 James Farber (engineer/mixer) and Joe Lovano (producer and artist) for 52nd Street Themes

 Best Jazz Vocal Album
 Erik Zobler (engineer/mixer), George Duke (producer) and Dianne Reeves for In the Moment – Live In Concert

 Best Contemporary Jazz Album
 Richard Battaglia, Robert Battaglia (engineers/mixers), Béla Fleck (engineer/mixer and producer) and Béla Fleck and the Flecktones for Outbound

 Best Latin Jazz Album
 Jon Fausty (engineer/mixer) and Chucho Valdés for Live at the Village Vanguard

Latin
 Best Latin Pop Album
 Adam Blackburn, Eric Schilling, Marcelo Añez, Sebastián Krys (engineers), Tim Mitchell (producer) and Shakira (producer and artist) for Shakira - TV Unplugged
 Best Traditional Tropical Latin Album
 Freddy Piñero Jr, Gustavo Celis, Javier Garza, Mauricio Guerrero, Scott Canto, Sebastián Krys (engineers), Emilio Estefan, George Noriega, Robert Blades (producers) and Gloria Estefan for Alma Caribeña
 Best Mexican/Mexican-American Album
 Carlos Ceballos (engineer/mixer) and Pepe Aguilar (producer and artist) for Por Una Mujer Bonita
 Best Latin Rock/Alternative Album
 Humberto Gatica (engineer and producer) and La Ley for Uno
 Best Tejano Album
 Edward Pérez, Greg García, (engineers), Freddie Martínez, Hugo Guerrero (engineers and producers) and The Legends for ¿Qué Es Música Tejana?
 Best Salsa Album
 Jon Fausty (engineer/mixer), Eddie Palmieri and Tito Puente (producers and artists) for Masterpiece/Obra Maestra
 Best Merengue Album
 David Hewitt and Hector Ivan Rosa (engineers/mixers) and Olga Tañón (producer and artist) for Olga Viva, Viva Olga

Musical show
 Best Musical Show Album
 Frank Filipetti (engineer/mixer and producer), Guy Babylon and Paul Bogaev, Chris Montan (producers), Elton John (composer), Tim Rice (lyricist) and the original Broadway cast for Elton John and Tim Rice's Aida

Music video
 Best Long Form Music Video
 Gimme Some Truth - The Making of John Lennon's Imagine Album - Andrew Solt (video director and producer); Greg Vines, Leslie Tong and Yoko Ono (video producers)

 Best Short Form Music Video
 "Learn To Fly" - Foo Fighters (artists); Jesse Peretz (video director); Tina Nakane (video producer)

New Age
Best New Age Album
 Thinking of You-KitarōPackaging and notes
 Best Recording Package
 Kevin Reagan (art director) for Music performed by Madonna
 Best Boxed Recording Package
 Arnold Levine and Frank Harkins (art directors) for Miles Davis and John Coltrane: The Complete Columbia Recordings 1955-1961 performed by Miles Davis and John Coltrane
 Best Album Notes
 Bob Blumenthal (notes writer) for Miles Davis and John Coltrane: The Complete Columbia Recordings 1955-1961 performed by Miles Davis and John Coltrane

Polka
Best Polka Album
 Touched by a Polka - Jimmy SturrPop
Best Female Pop Vocal Performance

 "I Try" - Macy Gray "What a Girl Wants" - Christina Aguilera
 "Music" - Madonna
 "Save Me" - Aimee Mann
 "Both Sides Now" - Joni Mitchell
 "Oops!...I Did It Again" - Britney Spears

Best Male Pop Vocal Performance

 "She Walks This Earth" - Sting "You Sang to Me" - Marc Anthony
 "Taking You Home" - Don Henley
 "She Bangs" - Ricky Martin
 "6, 8, 12" - Brian McKnight

Best Pop Performance by a Duo or Group with Vocals

 "Cousin Dupree" - Steely Dan "Show Me The Meaning Of Being Lonely" - Backstreet Boys
 "Pinch Me" - Barenaked Ladies
 "Breathless" - The Corrs
 "Bye Bye Bye" - *NSYNC

Best Pop Collaboration with Vocals

 "Is You Is or Is You Ain't My Baby" - B.B. King and Dr. John "Thank God I Found You" - Mariah Carey, 98 Degrees and Joe
 "The Difficult Kind" - Sheryl Crow and Sarah McLachlan
 "All the Way" - Celine Dion and Frank Sinatra
 "Turn Your Lights Down Low" - Lauryn Hill and Bob Marley

Best Pop Instrumental Performance

Brian Setzer for "Caravan" performed by the Brian Setzer Orchestra

Best Dance Recording

Michael Mangini, Steve Greenberg (producers and mixers) and Baha Men for "Who Let the Dogs Out"

Best Pop Vocal AlbumTwo Against Nature - Steely Dan
Music - MadonnaOops!... I Did It Again - Britney SpearsNo Strings Attached - NSYNCInside Job - Don HenleyBest Pop Instrumental AlbumSymphony No. 1 - Joe JacksonProduction and engineering
Best Engineered Album, Non-Classical
 Dave Russell, Elliot Scheiner, Phil Burnett and Roger Nichols (engineers) for Two Against Nature performed by Steely DanBest Engineered Album, Classical
 John M. Eargle (engineer) for Dvorák: Requiem, Op. 89; Sym. No. 9, Op. 95 "From the New World"
Producer of the Year, Non-Classical
 Dr. DreProducer of the Year, Classical
 Steven EpsteinRemixer of the Year, Non-Classical
 Hex HectorR&B
Best Female R&B Vocal Performance
 "He Wasn't Man Enough" - Toni BraxtonBest Male R&B Vocal Performance
 "Untitled (How Does It Feel)" - D'AngeloBest R&B Performance by a Duo or Group with Vocal
 "Say My Name" - Destiny's ChildBest Traditional R&B Vocal Album
 Ear-Resistible - The TemptationsBest R&B Song
 LaShawn Daniels, Fred Jerkins III, Rodney Jerkins, Beyoncé Knowles, LeToya Luckett, LaTavia Roberson and Kelendria Rowland for "Say My Name" performed by Destiny's Child
Best R&B Album
 Voodoo - D'AngeloRap
Best Rap Solo Performance
 "The Real Slim Shady" – Eminem "The Light" – Common
 "Party Up (Up in Here)" – DMX
 "Shake Ya Ass" – Mystikal
 "Country Grammar" – Nelly

Best Rap Performance by a Duo or Group
 "Forgot About Dre" – Dr. Dre featuring Eminem "Alive" – Beastie Boys
 "Oooh." – De La Soul featuring Redman
 "The Next Episode" – Dr. Dre featuring Snoop Dogg
 "Big Pimpin'" – Jay-Z featuring UGK

Best Rap Album
 The Marshall Mathers LP – Eminem ...And Then There Was X – DMX
 Dr. Dre – 2001 – Dr. Dre
 Vol. 3... Life and Times of S. Carter – Jay-Z
 Country Grammar – Nelly

Reggae
Best Reggae Album
 Art and Life - Beenie ManRock
Best Female Rock Vocal Performance
 "There Goes the Neighborhood (Live)" – Sheryl Crow "Paper Bag" – Fiona Apple
 "Enough Of Me" – Melissa Etheridge
 "So Pure" – Alanis Morissette
 "Glitter In Their Eyes" – Patti Smith

Best Male Rock Vocal Performance
 "Again" – Lenny Kravitz "Thursday's Child" – David Bowie
 "Things Have Changed" – Bob Dylan
 "Workin' It" – Don Henley
 "Into The Void" – Nine Inch Nails

Best Rock Performance by a Duo or Group with Vocal
 "Beautiful Day" – U2 "It's My Life" – Bon Jovi
 "With Arms Wide Open" – Creed
 "Learn To Fly" – Foo Fighters
 "Californication" – Red Hot Chili Peppers

Best Hard Rock Performance
 "Guerrilla Radio" – Rage Against the Machine "American Bad Ass" – Kid Rock 
 "Take A Look Around (Theme From "M:I-2")" – Limp Bizkit 
 "Grievance" – Pearl Jam 
 "Down" – Stone Temple Pilots 

Best Metal Performance
 "Elite" – Deftones "The Wicker Man" – Iron Maiden
 "Astonishing Panorama Of The Endtimes" – Marilyn Manson
 "Revolution Is My Name" – Pantera
 "Wait And Bleed" – Slipknot

Best Rock Instrumental Performance
 Michael Kamen (conductor), Metallica  and the San Francisco Symphony Orchestra for "The Call of Ktulu"

Best Rock Song
 Scott Stapp and Mark Tremonti (songwriters) for "With Arms Wide Open" performed by Creed

Best Rock Album
 Adam Kasper (engineer/mixer and producer) and Foo Fighters (producer and artist) for There Is Nothing Left to Lose

Spoken
 Best Spoken Word Album
 Rick Harris, John Runnette (producers) and Sidney Poitier for The Measure of a Man

 Best Spoken Comedy Album
 John Runnette (producer) and George Carlin for Brain Droppings

Traditional pop
Best Traditional Pop Vocal Album
 Allen Sides, Geoff Foster (engineers/mixers), Larry Klein (producer) and Joni Mitchell (producer and artist) for Both Sides, NowWorld
Best World Music Album
 Moogie Canazio (engineer/mixer and producer), Caetano Veloso (producer) and João Gilberto for João Voz e Violão

Special Merit Awards
 MusiCares Person of the Year
 Paul Simon

 Lifetime Achievement Award
 The Beach Boys
 Tony Bennett
 Sammy Davis, Jr.
 Bob Marley
 The Who

Trivia
 The three awards Steely Dan won were their first ever career Grammy wins.
 Eminem's controversial The Marshall Mathers LP, which had several nominations, including Album of the Year, caused outrage. 200 protesters on behalf of GLAAD and other groups gathered outside the Staples Center to protest Eminem's album which they considered homophobic and sexist. He performed his hit single "Stan" as a duet with openly gay musician Elton John at the ceremony in response to these allegations. This version is also featured as the final track on Eminem's 2005 compilation Curtain Call: The Hits''.

References

 043
2001 in American music
2001 in California
2001 music awards
2001 in Los Angeles
February 2001 events in the United States
Grammy